Javier Ignacio Macaya Danus (born 11 November 1978) is a Chilean lawyer and politician of the Independent Democratic Union party.

Since 2020, he is the president of his party.

References

External links
 Profile at Chamber of Deputies

1978 births
Living people
21st-century Chilean lawyers
Pontifical Catholic University of Chile alumni
Independent Democratic Union politicians
21st-century Chilean politicians
People from San Fernando, Chile
Members of the Chamber of Deputies of Chile
Senators of the LVI Legislative Period of the National Congress of Chile